Hillside Cemetery is located in Lyndhurst, New Jersey.

Notable burials

 Maxwell Becton (1868–1951), co-founder of Becton-Dickinson
 Fairleigh S. Dickinson (1866–1948), co-founder of Becton-Dickinson and benefactor of Fairleigh Dickinson University
 Joey Ramone (1951–2001), member of the Ramones
 Alexander Russell Webb (1846–1916), writer, publisher, early American convert to Islam and the United States Ambassador to the Philippines
 William Carlos Williams (1883–1963), poet

See also
Bergen County cemeteries

References

External links
 

Cemeteries in Bergen County, New Jersey
Lyndhurst, New Jersey